The purple starling (Lamprotornis purpureus), also known as the purple glossy starling,  is a member of the starling family of birds.

Distribution and habitat
It is a resident breeder in tropical Africa from Senegal and north Zaire east to Sudan and west Kenya. This common passerine is typically found in open woodland and cultivation.

Description
The adults of these stocky 22–23 cm long birds have a metallic purple head and body, and glossy green wings. They have a short tail and a yellow eye. The sexes are similar, but juveniles are much duller, with grey underparts and a brown iris.

Behaviour
This is a gregarious and noisy bird, with typical starling squeaks and chattering.

Breeding
The purple starling builds a nest in a hole. The normal clutch is two eggs.

Feeding
Like most starlings, the purple starling is omnivorous, eating fruit and insects.

References

Birds of The Gambia by Barlow, Wacher and Disley, 

purple starling
purple starling
Birds of Sub-Saharan Africa
purple starling
purple starling